Kemptthal railway station is a railway station in the Swiss canton of Zurich and municipality of Lindau. The station is located on the Zurich to Winterthur main line. The station's name refers to the Kempt Valley (of River Kempt).

Services 
The station is an intermediate stop on Zurich S-Bahn service S7 and S24. The S24 service does only call at Kemptthal station until 9:20 pm.  the following services stop at Kemptthal :

 Zürich S-Bahn

References

External links 
 
 

Kemptthal
Kemptthal